The Nipawin Hawks are a Canadian junior "A" team based in Nipawin, Saskatchewan.  They are members of the Saskatchewan Junior Hockey League (SJHL).  They play their home games at the Centennial Arena, which has a seating capacity of 1,500.  The team colors are black and yellow.

The Hawks have won two SJHL championships (1990 and 2018). Nipawin won the 1990 ANAVET Cup, coached by Bob Lowes.

Season-by-season standings

Playoffs

1986 DNQ
1987 Lost Quarter-final
Yorkton Terriers defeated Nipawin Hawks 4-games-to-3
1988 Lost Semi-final
Nipawin Hawks defeated Flin Flon Bombers 4-games-to-none
Notre Dame Hounds defeated Nipawin Hawks 4-games-to-none
1989 Lost Final
Nipawin Hawks defeated Battlefords North Stars 4-games-to-2
Nipawin Hawks defeated Notre Dame Hounds 4-games-to-2
Humboldt Broncos defeated Nipawin Hawks 4-games-to-1
1990 Won League, Won Anavet Cup, Lost 1990 Centennial Cup semi-final
Nipawin Hawks defeated Flin Flon Bombers 4-games-to-none
Nipawin Hawks defeated Weyburn Red Wings 4-games-to-3
Nipawin Hawks defeated Yorkton Terriers 4-games-to-2 SJHL CHAMPIONS
Nipawin Hawks defeated Portage Terriers (MJHL) 4-games-to-2 ANAVET CUP CHAMPIONS
Third in 1990 Centennial Cup round robin (2–2)
Vernon Lakers (BCJHL) defeated Nipawin Hawks 11–5 in semi-final
1991 Lost Semi-final
Nipawin Hawks defeated Melfort Mustangs 4-games-to-2
Humboldt Broncos defeated Nipawin Hawks 4-games-to-3
1992 DNQ
1993 Lost Semi-final
Nipawin Hawks defeated Melfort Mustangs 4-games-to-2
Flin Flon Bombers defeated Nipawin Hawks 4-games-to-1
1994 Lost Quarter-final
Nipawin Hawks defeated Flin Flon Bombers 2-games-to-none
Melfort Mustangs defeated Nipawin Hawks 4-games-to-3
1995 Lost Quarter-final
Melfort Mustangs defeated Nipawin Hawks 4-games-to-2
1996 Lost Quarter-final
Battlefords North Stars defeated Nipawin Hawks 4-games-to-2
1997 Lost Semi-final
Nipawin Hawks defeated Kindersley Klippers 4-games-to-none
Battlefords North Stars defeated Nipawin Hawks 4-games-to-2
1998 Lost Final
Nipawin Hawks defeated Battlefords North Stars 4-games-to-none
Nipawin Hawks defeated Kindersley Klippers 4-games-to-1
Weyburn Red Wings defeated Nipawin Hawks 4-games-to-1
1999 DNQ
2000 Eliminated in Preliminary round robin
Third in round robin (1–3) vs. Kindersley Klippers and Humboldt Broncos
2001 Lost Final
Nipawin Hawks defeated Kindersley Klippers 4-games-to-none
Nipawin Hawks defeated Flin Flon Bombers 4-games-to-1
Weyburn Red Wings defeated Nipawin Hawks 4-games-to-2
2002 Lost Quarter-final
Melfort Mustangs defeated Nipawin Hawks 4-games-to-3
2003 DNQ
2004 Lost Quarter-final
Humboldt Broncos defeated Nipawin Hawks 4-games-to-3
2005 Lost Preliminary
Melfort Mustangs defeated Nipawin Hawks 4-games-to-2
2006 Lost Quarter-final
Second in round robin (2–2) vs. Battlefords North Stars and La Ronge Ice Wolves
La Ronge Ice Wolves defeated Nipawin Hawks 4-games-to-none
2007 Lost Semi-final
Nipawin Hawks defeated La Ronge Ice Wolves 4-games-to-2
Nipawin Hawks defeated Battlefords North Stars 4-games-to-2
Humboldt Broncos defeated Nipawin Hawks 4-games-to-2
2008 Lost Quarter-final
Nipawin Hawks defeated La Ronge Ice Wolves 4-games-to-2
Humboldt Broncos defeated Nipawin Hawks 4-games-to-2
2009 Lost Preliminary
Battlefords North Stars defeated Nipawin Hawks 3-games-to-none 
2010
DNQ
2011
DNQ
2012
Preliminary Round  Nipawin Hawks earned bye
Quarter-Finals  Battlefords North Stars defeated Nipawin Hawks 4-games-to-3
2013
Preliminary Round  Nipawin Hawks earned bye
Quarter-Finals  Flin Flon Bombers defeated Nipawin Hawks 4-games-to-2
2014
Preliminary Round Notre Dame Hounds defeated Nipawin Hawks 3-games-to-1
2015
Preliminary round Nipawin Hawks earned bye
Quarter-finals Nipawin Hawks defeated Melville Millionaires 4-games-to-2
Semi-final Melfort Mustangs defeated Nipawin Hawks 4-games-to-1
2016
Preliminary round Nipawin Hawks earned bye
Quarter-finals Nipawin Hawks defeated Estevan Bruins 4-games-to-2
Semi-final Melfort Mustangs defeated Nipawin Hawks 4-games-to-3
2017
Preliminary round Nipawin Hawks earned bye
Quarter-finals Nipawin Hawks defeated Humboldt Broncos 4-games-to-0
Semi-final Flin Flon Bombers defeated Nipawin Hawks 4-games-to-3
2018 Lost AVANET Cup
Preliminary round Nipawin Hawks earned bye
Quarter-finals Nipawin Hawks defeated Flin Flon Bombers 4-games-to-1
Semi-final Nipawin Hawks were leading Humboldt Broncos 3-games-to-1 when the fatal Broncos bus crash occurred on April 6, 2018 on their way to Game 5.
Canalta Cup Nipawin Hawks defeated Estevan Bruins 4-games-to-1 SJHL CHAMPIONS
AVANET Cup Steinbach Pistons defeated Nipawin Hawks 4-games-to-2
2019
Quarter-finals Yorkton Terriers defeated Nipawin Hawks 4-games-to-3
2020
Quarter-finals Battlefords North Stars lead the Nipawin Hawks 3-games-to-1 before the COVID-19 pandemic ended the season
2021
Season cancelled due to COVID-19
2022
DNQ
2023
Quarter-finals Humboldt Broncos

Current Roster
Updated November 8, 2022

NHL alumni
Nolan Schaefer – Minnesota Wild
Greg Classen – Nashville Predators
Mark Smith – San Jose Sharks, Calgary Flames
Curtis Murphy – Minnesota Wild
Adam Beckman - Minnesota Wild
Jaxsen Wiebe - Anaheim Ducks

See also
 List of ice hockey teams in Saskatchewan

References

External links
 Nipawin Hawks official website

Saskatchewan Junior Hockey League teams
Ice hockey clubs established in 1985
1985 establishments in Saskatchewan